Maanasamrakshanam is a 1945 Indian Tamil language film, produced and directed by K. Subramaniam with S. D. Subbulakshmi, G. Pattu Iyer, V. N. Janaki, T. R. Ramachandran and Kali N. Rathnam. The film is lost.

Plot
During World War II, Japan invaded Burma (now known as Myanmar in 1941. Many Indians have adopted Burma as their country and were living there. The invasion brought many hardships to these Indians. They started migrating to India walking hundreds of miles through jungles and mountains while the enemy was on pursuit. The heroine set up an organisation in India to take care of the lost children. This organisation was called Maanasamrakshana. The heroine is involved in nationalistic activities. She defeats the villain's anti-national activities. She faces her own relatives who misappropriates her wealth.

Cast
S. D. SubbulakshmiG. Pattu IyerV. N. JanakiT. R. RamachandranKali N. RathnamT. K. SampangiM. R. S. ManiT. R. B. RaoM. A. Ganapathi BhatV. S. Santhanam AyyangarRamanuja ChariarV. A. S. ManiMaster SathasivamNagalakshmiKumari Subbulakshmi

Crew
 Producer: K. Subramaniam
 Directors: K. Subramaniam, C. S. V. Iyer
 Cinematography: Thambu (a cousin of K. Subramaniam)
 Art Direction: F. Nagoor, Ghodgaonkar
 Music (Background Score): K. C. Thyagarajan
 Lyrics: Papanasam Rajagopala Iyer (Papanasam Sivan's brother)

References

1945 films
1940s Tamil-language films
Indian black-and-white films
Indian war films
1945 war films
Lost Indian films
Films directed by K. Subramanyam
1940s lost films
Lost war films